Naval Headquarters (NHQ) is the headquarters of the Sri Lanka Navy. Established in 1950, it is housed at SLNS Parakrama at Flagstaff Street, Fort Colombo.

See also
 Office of the Chief of Defence Staff
 Army Headquarters (Sri Lanka)
 Air Headquarters (Sri Lanka)

References 

Sri Lanka Navy
Colombo
Military headquarters in Sri Lanka
Sri Lanka
1950 establishments in Ceylon